Pholisma sonorae, commonly known as sandfood, is a rare and unusual species of flowering plant endemic to the Sonoran Deserts to the west of Yuma, Arizona in the California Yuha,  Mojave Desert and Colorado Desert, and south in the Yuma Desert, where it is known from only a few locations.

Description
Pholisma sonorae is a perennial herb which grows in sand dunes, its fleshy stem extending up to two meters (six feet) below the surface and emerging above as a small rounded or ovate form. It may be somewhat mushroom-shaped if enough sand blows away to reveal the top of the stem. It is a parasitic plant which attaches to the roots of various desert shrubs such as wild buckwheats, ragweeds, plucheas, and Tiquilia plicata and T. palmeri to obtain nutrients.

As a heterotroph, the Pholisma sonorae plant lacks chlorophyll and is grayish, whitish, or brown in color. It has glandular scale-like leaves along its surface. The plant obtains water not from its host plants, but through stomata in its leaves. The plant blooms in centimeter-wide flowers which are pink to purple in color with white margins.

Uses
This was an important food item for certain desert-dwelling Native American peoples, including the Cocopah and the Hia C-eḍ O'odham.

Status
The plant is rare as its habitat of shifting dune sands has been depleted by development.

References

External links
Jepson Manual Treatment - Pholisma sonorae
USDA Plants Profile; Pholisma sonorae
Pholisma sonorae - Photo gallery

sonorae
Parasitic plants
Flora of the Sonoran Deserts
Flora of the California desert regions
Flora of Baja California
Flora of Sonora
Natural history of the Colorado Desert
Root vegetables
Plants described in 1854